Straight No Chaser is a British music magazine based in London. Originally published between 1988 and 2007, it restarted publishing in mid 2017 in a limited edition format, released once a year. The magazine covers various forms of black music and electronic music.

The magazine was founded by journalists Paul Bradshaw, Neil Spencer, and Kathryn Willgress to cover music of black origin including hip hop, dance, reggae, Latin and African styles that were largely ignored by mainstream media. It emerged in June 1988 coinciding with the Second Summer of Love.

Publishing
It was published in the UK and distributed for sale across Britain, much of Europe, metropolitan areas of the US and Japan. Claiming to be the first magazine to be designed and laid out exclusively on Apple Mac computers, the first few issues were designed by Ian "Swifty" Swift at Neville Brody's studio where he worked as assistant designer of influential culture magazine, The Face. Starting out as a quarterly, the team then moved to 43B Coronet Street, Shoreditch, London, N1 6HD. It moved to pent annually (5 times) a year from 1992, however the actual number of issues released would fluctuate year on year and it didn't have a regular release date, so regular purchasers of the magazine often had to keep an eye out for its release when it happened. It also had a slightly differing version that was published and distributed for sale separately in Japan. Occasionally a covermount CD or tape was also included with the magazine, sometimes either only for a limited number of copies or for its initial print run for that issue, but other times only for sale on the Japanese edition.

Tenth year anniversary
In July 1998, to celebrate the magazine's tenth birthday, Paul Bradshaw gathered all of the current contributors for a photograph with photographer Peter Williams. In tribute to Art Kane's famous 1958 group portrait of New York jazz players, A Great Day in Harlem, the photo was named A Great Day in Hoxton. Alongside prominent music business faces such as Gilles Peterson and James Lavelle were many talented designers, fashion professionals, writers, dancers, and fellow photographers.

Slogans
The Magazine Tuned to the Freedom Principle
The Magazine of World Jazz Jive
Interplanetary Sounds: Ancient To Future

Content and themes
SNC magazines' main slogan was Interplanetary Sounds: Ancient To Future, which basically meant it covered Jazz music at the centre, with other black music's from around the world—especially soulful electronic music—forming the core of its focus. While most of the magazine contained charts from eminent DJ's on the scene (including a regular chart from Bradshaw's DJ friends James Lavelle, Dave Hucker, Ross Allen, and Gilles Peterson) or articles on underground music scenes around the world, it also had an eye on contemporary artwork, and underground fashionable trends in and outside various music communities usually not generally well-known about outside of the world's big urban centres (London, Paris, Tokyo, New York, San Francisco, et al.). Alongside cutting edge graphics, the magazine championed the works of emerging writers, photographers, and illustrators as well as providing an alternative context for world renowned writers including Commonwealth Writers' Prize winner Pauline Melville, and Booker Prize winner Michael Ondaatje.

The magazine was often compared with the US magazine publication Wax Poetics which came along later, and could be argued copied Straight No Chaser's style in some design and content ways.

Editions
The original magazine had 92 issues, released across two volumes of 46 issues in each: the first volume from 1988 to 1998, the second from 1998 to the last edition in 2007. In 2017, a new volume of the magazine was released, with three issues being released so far.

Volume 1: 1988 to 1998
Photo cover artists featured on the first volume issues:
1 (1988, Summer): Lennie Tristano
2 (1988, Autumn): The Jazz Renegades (ft. Julian Joseph)
3 (1989, Spring): no one (ft. Reggae Philharmonic Orchestra)
4 (1989, Summer): Youssou N'Dour
5 (1989, Autumn): Cassandra Wilson
6 (1989, Winter): Branford Marsalis
7 (1990, Spring): Courtney Pine
8 (1990, Summer): Anita Baker
9 (1990, Autumn): Brenda Fassie
10 (1990, Winter): Baaba Maal
11 (1991, Spring): Cleveland Watkiss
12 (1991, Summer): Greg Osby
13 (1991, Autumn): Carleen Anderson (Young Disciples)
14 (1991, Winter): A Tribe Called Quest
15 (1992, Spring): Brand New Heavies
16 (1992, Spring-Summer): Omar
17 (1992, Summer): Galliano
18 (1992, Autumn): MC Solaar
19 (1992, Winter): John Coltrane
20 (1993, Spring): Tom Waits
21 (1993, Spring-Summer): various (Fifth Anniversary Issue)
22 (1993, Summer): Jazzmatazz (Guru, Donald Byrd)
23 (1993, Autumn): Apache Indian
24 (1993, Winter): Cassandra Wilson
25 (1994, Spring): Meshell Ndegeocello
26 (1994, Spring-Summer): Carleen Anderson
27 (1994, Summer): Dr John, Omar
28 (1994, Autumn): MC Solaar
29 (1994, Winter): Herbie Hancock
30 (1995, Spring): Flora Purim
31 (1995, Spring-Summer): no one (features a Sidewinder vol.3: South Africa '95 – Collisions & Collusions pull-out)
32 (1995, Summer): Steve Williamson (Outside, Cleveland Watkiss, 4hero)
33 (1995, Autumn): Kemistry & Storm (included covermount CD, a B&W Music sampler titled South Africa '95 with no track listing on the CD or magazine, a promo for the vinyl only 3xLP album by Outernational Meltdown – South Africa Outernational Meltdown)
34 (1995, Winter): Leftfield
35 (1996, Spring): Courtney Pine, Cassandra Wilson
36 (1996, Spring-Summer): Valerie Etienne
37 (1996, Summer): Carlinhos Brown
38 (1996, Autumn): Palm Skin Productions
39 (1996, Winter): A Guy Called Gerald
40 (1997, Spring): Jhelisa
41 (1997, Spring-Summer): Roni Size
42 (1997, Spring): United Future Organization
43 (1997, Autumn): Beth Orton
44 (1997, Winter): 4hero
45 (1998, Spring): David Byrne
46 (1998, Spring-Summer): Sizzla

Volume 2: 1998 to 2007
Photo cover artists featured on the second volume issues:
1 (1998, Summer): Talvin Singh (included covermount CD, a Palm Pictures label sampler)
2 (1998, Autumn): Busi Mhlongo
3 (1998, Winter): Alison David
4 (1999, Spring): Femi Kuti
5 (1999, Summer): Underground Resistance
6 (1999, Summer): Nitin Sawhney
7 (1999, Autumn): Rahsaan Roland Kirk
8 (1999, Winter): Nikki Yeoh
9 (2000, Spring): Joseph Jarman (Art Ensemble of Chicago)
10 (2000, Spring-Summer): Fabio
11 (2000, Summer): Doze Green
12 (2000, Autumn): Wookie
13 (2000, Winter): Roni Size+Reprazent
14 (2001, Spring): Skitz
15 (2001, Spring-Summer): Spacek
16 (2001, Summer): Osunlade
17 (2001, Autumn): Ursula Rucker
18 (2001, Winter): 4hero
19 (2002, Spring): Seu Jorge
20 (2002, Spring-Summer): Cinematic Orchestra
21 (2002, Summer): DJ Jazzy Jeff
22 (2002, Autumn): Madlib
23 (2002, Winter): Donnie (née Donnie Johnson)
24 (2003, Spring): Jeff Mills
25 (2003, Summer): Amp Fiddler
26 (2003, Summer): Roy Hargrove
27 (2003, Autumn): Two Banks of Four
28 (2003, Winter): no one (two illustrated dancers, in relation to Puerto Rico's Candela Art and Music Festival article)
29 (2004, Spring): Dani Siciliano
30 (2004, Spring-Summer): Afoxé Filhos De Gandhi (Brasil 04 issue)
31 (2004, Summer): Theo Parrish
32 (2004, Autumn): Björk
33 (2004, Winter): Sa-Ra Creative Partners
34 (2005, Spring): Róisín Murphy
35 (2005, Spring-Summer): Saul Williams
36 (2005, Summer): Dwight Trible & Life Force
37 (2005, Autumn): Meshell Ndegeocello
38 (2005, Winter): Soil & "Pimp" Sessions
39 (2006, Spring): Jhelisa
40 (2006, Spring-Summer): Marc Mac
41 (2006, Summer): Gilles Peterson, Milton Nascimento
42 (2006, Autumn): Rza
43 (2006, Winter): Georgia Anne Muldrow
44 (2007, Spring): Cinematic Orchestra
45 (2007, Spring-Summer): Tawiah
46 (2007, Summer): no one (titled: The Final Issue: Tuned To The Freedom Principle – Life, Love & Unity)

Later volume: 2017 to present
Photo cover artists featured on the later volume issues:
1 (2017, Summer, "Issue 98"): Georgia Anne Muldrow
2 (2018, Summer, "Issue 99"): Cassie Kinoshi
3 (2019, Summer, "Issue 100"): Thelonious Monk

Original ending
For various reasons, not least declining magazine sales with the spread of internet usage and thus a loss in its advertising revenues, plus the changing affects in the general music culture from vinyl and CD collecting to more digital downloading and streaming, Bradshaw decided to shut the original magazine down in 2007 with the last issue being number 46 from volume 2, the Summer edition released around August that year.

No digital versions (pdf, ePub, or similar, format) of the magazine were ever released, and there have so far been no plans to reissue them as such.

Limited relaunch
In January 2017, a relaunch was announced with sales of the first issue (strangely sold as "issue 98") going live online on 1 September 2017, with a second issue (sold as "issue 99") released in September 2018., and third issue ("issue 100") released in September 2019

See also
Wax Poetics
Shook

References

External links
 – official site (2017 volume onwards)
Straight No Chaser – the original British edition's site, (with new reviews, features, and radio show) (archive)
Straight No Chaser – the original Japanese edition's site (archive)
Straight No Chaser at Discogs (list of associated releases)
Straight No Chaser at Bookogs
Straight No Chaser at Magpile
Ancient To Future – site of SNC editor Paul Bradshaw

1988 establishments in England
2007 disestablishments in England
2017 establishments in England
Annual magazines published in the United Kingdom
Dance music magazines
Jazz magazines
Magazines published in London
Magazines established in 1988
Magazines disestablished in 2007
Magazines established in 2017
Music magazines published in the United Kingdom
Quarterly magazines published in the United Kingdom